André Paiement (June 28, 1950 – January 23, 1978) was a Canadian playwright and musician. He was one of the most prominent Franco-Ontarian artists, playing a key role in developing many of the cultural institutions of the community.

Biography

Born in Sturgeon Falls, Ontario, Paiement studied translation at Laurentian University in Sudbury, and got involved in theatre.
 
Paiement, with a group of artists that included Robert Paquette, wrote and staged the musical Moé, j'viens du Nord, s'tie! in 1970. The artists subsequently formed the Coopérative des artistes du Nouvel Ontario, which evolved in a variety of directions. Some of the artists, including Paiement,  established the professional theatre company Théâtre du Nouvel-Ontario. Others, including Paiement and his sister Rachel, subsequently formed the progressive rock band, CANO-Musique.

Paiement himself was active in both the theatre and band projects. His stage productions included Et le septième jour..., À mes fils bien-aimés, La vie et les temps de Médéric Boileau, Lavalléville and an adaptation in Franco-Ontarian dialect (joual) of Molière's Malade imaginaire. He was also a key organizer behind the music festivals La Nuit sur l'étang and Northern Lights Festival Boréal.

Paiement committed suicide on January 23, 1978.

Works

Theater plays
 1970 - Moé j'viens du Nord, s'tie!
 1970 - Et le septième jour
 1971 - Pépère parent
 1972 - À mes fils bien-aimés
 1973 - La Vie et les temps de Médéric Boileau
 1974 - Lavalléville, comédie musicale franco-ontarienne
 1977 - A book of thoughts and words, inédit.

Songs
 See CANO
 1968 - At morn, at noon, at twilight dim
 1977 - Blue dragonfly

References

1950 births
1978 suicides
20th-century Canadian dramatists and playwrights
Canadian songwriters
Franco-Ontarian people
Musicians from Greater Sudbury
Writers from Greater Sudbury
Laurentian University alumni
People from West Nipissing
Canadian folk rock musicians
Canadian dramatists and playwrights in French
Canadian male dramatists and playwrights
20th-century Canadian male musicians
French-language singers of Canada
20th-century Canadian male writers